The 2006 Ladies European Tour was a series of weekly golf tournaments for elite female golfers from around the world which took place from January through October 2006. The tournaments were sanctioned by the Ladies European Tour (LET). The tour featured 21 events with prize money totalling more than €10.6 million. Laura Davies won the Order of Merit with earnings of €471,727.42.

Tournament results
The table below shows the 2006 schedule. The numbers in brackets after the winners' names show the number of career wins they had on the Ladies European Tour up to and including that event. This is only shown for members of the tour.

Major championships are shown in bold.

Order of Merit rankings

See also
2006 LPGA Tour
2006 in golf

References 

Ladies European Tour
Ladies European Tour
Ladies European Tour